Carson is a small census-designated place in the Columbia River Gorge National Scenic Area, north of the Columbia River in Skamania County, in the southwestern part of Washington, United States.

Carson is located north of Washington State Route 14 and the town lies south of Stabler and between Stevenson to the west and Underwood and the neighboring cities of Bingen and White Salmon to the east.

History
A post office called Carson has been in operation since 1894. The community takes its name from nearby Carson Creek.

Geography
According to the United States Census Bureau, the CDP has a total area of 4.7 square miles (12.2 km2), of which, 4.7 square miles (12.1 km2) of it is land and 0.04 square miles (0.1 km2) of it (0.43%) is water.

Demographics

As of the census of 2000, there were 2,116 people, 797 households, and 572 families residing in the CDP. The population density was 452.8 people per square mile (174.9/km2). There were 894 housing units at an average density of 191.3/sq mi (73.9/km2). The racial makeup of the CDP was 88.52% White, 0.33% African American, 3.50% Native American, 0.24% Asian, 0.57% Pacific Islander, 3.64% from other races, and 3.21% from two or more races. Hispanic or Latino of any race were 6.10% of the population.

There were 797 households, out of which 36.5% had children under the age of 18 living with them, 56.5% were married couples living together, 9.8% had a female householder with no husband present, and 28.2% were non-families. 23.3% of all households were made up of individuals, and 8.5% had someone living alone who was 65 years of age or older. The average household size was 2.65 and the average family size was 3.09.

In the CDP, the age distribution of the population shows 28.7% under the age of 18, 7.3% from 18 to 24, 29.5% from 25 to 44, 23.1% from 45 to 64, and 11.4% who were 65 years of age or older. The median age was 36 years. For every 100 females, there were 99.6 males. For every 100 females age 18 and over, there were 96.4 males.

The median income for a household in the CDP was $33,598, and the median income for a family was $40,519. Males had a median income of $31,413 versus $25,478 for females. The per capita income for the CDP was $14,922. About 9.4% of families and 13.7% of the population were below the poverty line, including 15.9% of those under age 18 and 11.1% of those age 65 or over.

Parks and recreation
Carson is situated within the Columbia River Gorge National Scenic Area and outside the southern end of Gifford Pinchot National Forest, which contains the nearby highland terrain areas of Wind Mountain and Dog Mountain.

The oldest arboretum in the Pacific Northwest, the Wind River Arboretum, is located in nearby Stabler. Carson has a local hot spring, and hotel and resort businesses in the town provide  geothermal steam baths.

See also
 List of census-designated places in Washington

References

Unincorporated communities in Skamania County, Washington
Unincorporated communities in Washington (state)
Columbia River Gorge
Hot springs of Washington (state)
Washington (state) populated places on the Columbia River
Bodies of water of Skamania County, Washington